Hubert Bindels (born 8 August 1958) is a Belgian former wrestler. He competed in the men's freestyle 90 kg at the 1988 Summer Olympics.

References

External links
 

1958 births
Living people
Belgian male sport wrestlers
Olympic wrestlers of Belgium
Wrestlers at the 1988 Summer Olympics
Sportspeople from Liège Province